The discography of San Francisco-based thrash metal band Testament consists of thirteen studio albums, four live albums, five compilations, two extended plays, thirteen singles, and three video albums. Originally forming in 1983 under the name Legacy they released two demos titled Demo 1 and Demo 2 and have since gone on to become one of the most influential thrash metal bands of all time. The band has gone through numerous lineup changes with the only constant member being guitarist Eric Peterson.

Studio albums

Live albums

Compilation albums

Singles

Music videos
"Over the Wall" (1987)
"Trial By Fire" (1988)
"Nobody's Fault" (1988)
"Practice What You Preach" (1989)
"Greenhouse Effect" (1990)
"The Ballad" (1990)
"Souls of Black" (1990)
"The Legacy" (1990)
"Electric Crown" (1992)
"Return to Serenity" (1992)
"Low" (1994)
"More Than Meets the Eye" (2008)
"Native Blood" (2012)
"The Pale King" (2016)
"Children of the Next Level"  (2020)

Videos

References 

Discography
Heavy metal group discographies
Discographies of American artists